Calca District is one of eight districts of the province Calca in Peru. The capital of the district is Calca, also known as the capital of the Sacred Valley.

Geography 
Some of the highest mountains of the Urupampa mountain range, Ch'iqun, Q'irayuq, Sawasiray and Siriwani, lie in the northwestern part of the Calca District. Other mountains of the district are listed below:

See also 
 Huch'uy Qusqu
 Llamayuq

References